The pink blind legless skink or Boulenger's legless skink (Typhlosaurus vermis) is a species of lizard in the family Scincidae. The species is endemic to South Africa.

References

Typhlosaurus
Skinks of Africa
Endemic reptiles of South Africa
Reptiles described in 1887
Taxa named by George Albert Boulenger